Mikhail Youzhny was the defending champion, but lost to Robin Haase in the quarterfinals.
Pablo Andújar won the title, defeating Juan Mónaco in the final, 6–3, 7–5.

Seeds
The top four seeds receive a bye into the second round.

Draw

Finals

Top half

Bottom half

Qualifying

Seeds

Qualifiers

Qualifying draw

First qualifier

Second qualifier

Third qualifier

Fourth qualifier

References
 Main Draw
 Qualifying Draw

Credit Agricole Suisse Open Gstaad - Singles
2014 Singles
2014 Crédit Agricole Suisse Open Gstaad